Ramboldia is a genus of lichen-forming fungi in the  family Ramboldiaceae. The genus was circumscribed in 1994 by Gintaras Kantvilas and John Alan Elix. It was emended in 2008 by the inclusion of Pyrrhospora species containing the anthraquinone russulone in their apothecia and having a prosoplectenchymatous exciple. The family Ramboldiaceae  was circumscribed in 2014 to contain the genus.

The genus name of Ramboldia is in honour of Gerhard Walter Rambold (b.1956), a German botanist (Lichenology and Mycology). He was also interested in Zoology and was a professor at Munich and Bayreuth. He was a colleague of the authors, Kantvilas and Elix.

Species
Ramboldia amagiensis  (2008)
Ramboldia amarkantakana  (2009)
Ramboldia arandensis  (2008)
Ramboldia atromarginata  (2016)
Ramboldia aurantiaca  (2008)
Ramboldia aurea  (2008)
Ramboldia blastidiata  (2007)
Ramboldia blochiana  (2011) – North America, Central America, South America, West Indies
Ramboldia brunneocarpa  (1994)
Ramboldia buleensis  (2017)
Ramboldia bullata  (2008)
Ramboldia cinnabarina  (2008)
Ramboldia crassithallina  (2001)
Ramboldia curvispora  (2017)
Ramboldia elabens  (2007)
Ramboldia farinosa  (2004)
Ramboldia gowardiana  (2008)
Ramboldia greeniana  (2016)
Ramboldia griseococcinea  (2008)
Ramboldia haematites  (2008)
Ramboldia heterocarpa  (2008)
Ramboldia insidiosa  (1995)
Ramboldia laeta  (2008)
Ramboldia lusitanica  (2008)
Ramboldia manipurensis  (2008)
Ramboldia neolaeta  (2008)
Ramboldia oxalifera  (2018)
Ramboldia petraeoides  (1994)
Ramboldia plicatula  (1994)
Ramboldia quaesitica  (2008)
Ramboldia russula  (2008)
Ramboldia sanguinolenta  (2008)
Ramboldia siamensis  (2009)
Ramboldia sorediata  (2001)
Ramboldia stuartii  (1994)
Ramboldia subcinnabarina  (2008)
Ramboldia subnexa  (1994)
Ramboldia subplicatula  (2017)

References

Lecanoraceae
Lecanorales genera
Taxa named by Gintaras Kantvilas
Taxa named by John Alan Elix
Taxa described in 1994